Psychotria tubuaiensis is a species of plant in the family Rubiaceae. It is endemic to French Polynesia.

References

tubuaiensis
Data deficient plants
Flora of the Tubuai Islands
Taxonomy articles created by Polbot